Fitchia mangarevensis was a species of flowering plant in the family Asteraceae. It was found only in French Polynesia and is now extinct.

References

magarevensis
Flora of French Polynesia
Extinct flora of Oceania
Plant extinctions since 1500
Taxonomy articles created by Polbot
Taxa named by Forest B.H. Brown